Keystone is an unincorporated census-designated place in Hillsborough County, Florida, United States. The Keystone area was first settled in the middle 1800s by the W.M. Mobley Family who migrated from Savannah, Georgia.  The region has evolved from citrus and farming into a rural retreat of  many lake homes and ranches. The population was 24,039 at the 2010 census, up from 14,627 at the 2000 census. The ZIP Codes encompassing the CDP area are 33556 and 33558.

Geography
Keystone is located in the northwest corner of Hillsborough County at  (28.127550, -82.589117). It is bordered to the east by Cheval and Northdale, to the southeast by Citrus Park, and to the south by Westchase, all in Hillsborough County. To the west, Keystone is bordered by East Lake in Pinellas County, and to the north the CDP is bordered by Trinity and Odessa in Pasco County.

Demographics

As of the census of 2000, there were 14,627 people, 5,160 households, and 4,380 families residing in the community. The racial makeup of the community was 91.30% White, 3.50% African American, 0.34% Native American, 2.45% Asian, 0.05% Pacific Islander, 0.94% from other races, and 1.42% from two or more races. Hispanic or Latino of any race were 8.48% of the population.

There were 5,160 households, out of which 41.7% had children under the age of 18 living with them, 78.2% were married couples living together, 4.7% had a female householder with no husband present, and 15.1% were non-families. 11.1% of all households were made up of individuals, and 3.0% had someone living alone who was 65 years of age or older.  The average household size was 2.83 and the average family size was 3.08.

In the community the population was spread out, with 27.2% under the age of 18, 4.8% from 18 to 24, 33.3% from 25 to 44, 27.1% from 45 to 64, and 7.7% who were 65 years of age or older.  The median age was 38 years. For every 100 females, there were 100.4 males.  For every 100 females age 18 and over, there were 97.9 males.

The median income for a household in the community was $80,677, and the median income for a family was $84,592 (these figures had risen to $106,549 and $112,119 respectively as of a 2007 estimate). Males had a median income of $55,905 versus $37,190 for females. The per capita income for the community was $35,136.  About 1.4% of families and 2.4% of the population were below the poverty line, including 2.7% of those under age 18 and 5.4% of those age 65 or over.

Schools
Keystone is served by Hillsborough County Public School through the following:
Bryant Elementary School
Hammond Elementary School
Northwest Elementary School
McKitrick Elementary School
Farnell Middle School
Martinez Middle School
Walker Middle School
Steinbrenner High School

References

Census-designated places in Hillsborough County, Florida
Census-designated places in Florida